2010–11 Hong Kong Second Division League is the 96th season of a football league in Hong Kong, Hong Kong Second Division League.

Changes from last season

From Second Division 
Promoted to First Division
 HKFC
 Tuen Mun
Relegated to Third Division
 Derico Friends

To Second Division 
Relegated from First Division
 Happy Valley
 Shatin
Promoted from Third Division League
 Lucky Mile
 Sham Shui Po
 Southern District
 Yuen Long

Name changing 
 Mutual renamed as Pontic
 Ongood renamed as Biu Chun

League table

Top scorers

Notes

Hong Kong Second Division League seasons
Hong
2010–11 in Hong Kong football leagues